William Warbrick ( – 28 October 1901) was a New Zealand rugby union footballer who toured with the 1888–89 New Zealand Native football team on their 107-match tour of New Zealand, Australia, and the British Isles. Playing at fullback, he was one of five Warbrick brothers who participated in the tour, which was captained and organised by his half-brother Joe.

Billy Warbrick played at least 59 matches during the Natives' tour, including at least 36 in the British Isles. He was one of the star players on tour, and was described by tour manager Thomas Eyton as "a dashing player, grand tackler, first-class kick, very quick at follow up".

Following the tour Warbrick moved to Australia where he played for Queensland, and then New South Wales. He also coached Australia in their first ever Test match—against the British Isles in 1899.

He contracted tuberculosis and returned to New Zealand shortly before he died in 1901.

References

Bibliography 

 

1866 births
1901 deaths
New Zealand rugby union players
Māori All Blacks players
20th-century deaths from tuberculosis
Tuberculosis deaths in New Zealand
Rugby union fullbacks